Bristow is an unincorporated community in Marlboro County, South Carolina, United States.

Geography
Bristow is located at latitude 34.419 and longitude –79.618. The elevation is 128 feet.

Demographics

References

External links

Unincorporated communities in Marlboro County, South Carolina
Unincorporated communities in South Carolina